The Chinese Ambassador to El Salvador is the official representative of the People's Republic of China to the Republic of El Salvador.

List of representatives

References 

China
El Salvador
Ambassadors